Cunco may refer to:
 Cuncos
 Cunco, Chile
 Cunco Castle near Villanueva del Fresno, Spain